Giovanni Borgoforte (1640–1687) was a Roman Catholic prelate who served as Bishop of Nona (1677–1687).

Biography
Giovanni Borgoforte was born in Trau, Croatia in 1640.
On 22 November 1677, he was appointed during the papacy of Pope Innocent XI as Bishop of Nona.
On 30 November 1677, he was consecrated bishop by Paluzzo Paluzzi Altieri Degli Albertoni, Camerlengo of the Sacred College of Cardinals, with Prospero Bottini, Titular Archbishop of Myra, and Lodovico Magni, Bishop of Acquapendente, serving as co-consecrators. 
He served as Bishop of Nona until his death in September 1687.

References

References 
 
  

17th-century Roman Catholic bishops in Croatia
Bishops appointed by Pope Innocent XI
1640 births
1687 deaths